Coddenham is a village and civil parish in the Mid Suffolk district of Suffolk in eastern England. Located to the north of the A14 road, 8 miles north of Ipswich, the parish also includes the hamlet of Coddenham Green. In 2005 its population was 570, increasing to 620 at the 2011 Census. Village facilities include a community village shop & café, a country club offering themed evenings, darts, pool & snooker and the Coddenham Centre.

During the Roman occupation of Britain, Coddenham was the largest settlement in Suffolk. There were two Roman forts at the site at Baylham House, which was known as Combretovium. The Roman road from Colchester (then Camulodunum) to Caistor St Edmund (then Venta Icenorum) in Norfolk ran through the town. Today it is a rural village with good amenities, excellent countryside walks, and a large and well-equipped children's play area.

The place-name 'Coddenham' is first attested in the Domesday Book of 1086, where it appears as Codenham. The name means 'Codda's homestead'.

The village was struck by an F1/T3 tornado on 23 November 1981, as part of the record-breaking nationwide tornado outbreak on that day.

The motocross racer  Dave Bickers was from Coddenham 

The astronomer and author Tom Boles lives in Coddenham

References

External links

Coddenham Parish Council Website
Coddenham Parish Community Website
Coddenham Community Shop
Coddenham Facebook Page
Coddenham Country Club Facebook Page
The Coddenham Centre Website
Bickers Action
Calvors Brewery
Combretovium in Roman Britain website

 
Villages in Suffolk
Civil parishes in Suffolk
Mid Suffolk District